is a retired Japanese professional catcher.

External links

Living people
1969 births
Japanese baseball players
Nippon Professional Baseball catchers
Nippon Ham Fighters players
Hokkaido Nippon-Ham Fighters players
Japanese baseball coaches
Nippon Professional Baseball coaches
Baseball people from Nagoya